{{Infobox pharaoh
|Name=Sakir-Har
|Image= 
|image_size=
|caption =
|Reign=
|Predecessor=Salitis?
|Successor=Khyan?
|role=Heqa-Khasut
| nomen          = Heqa-Khasut, Sakir-Har Ḥq3 ḫ3swt Skr Hr Ruler of foreign countries (=Hyksos), Reward of Har S38-N25:Z2 z:k:r-h:r
| nebty          =Tjes-pedjut Ṯz-pḏwt He who subdues the bow people| nebty_hiero    =V1-T10:T10:T10
| golden         =Iri-tash-ef Jrj-t3š.f  He who establishes his boundary| golden_hiero   =ir-t:U30-A-S:Z9:f
|Spouse= 
|Children=
|Dynasty=15th Dynasty 
|Father= 
|Mother= 
|Born= 
|Died= 
|Monuments=A doorjamb from Tell el-Dab'a
}}

Sakir-Har (also Seker-Har and Skr-Hr) was a Hyksos king of the Fifteenth Dynasty of Egypt, ruling over some part of Lower Egypt during the Second Intermediate Period, possibly in the early 16th century BC. 

Attestation
Sakir-Har is attested by a single inscription on a doorjamb excavated at Tell el-Dab'a—ancient Avaris—by Manfred Bietak in the 1990s.

Cairo TD-8316
The doorjamb, now in Cairo  under the catalog number Cairo TD-8316, bears his partial royal titulary in the manner of the Ancient Egyptian, showing his Nebti and Golden Falcon names, as well as his nomen. The doorjamb reads 

Theories
The doorjamb confirms the identity of Sakir-Har as one of the kings of the Hyksos Fifteenth Dynasty of Egypt. His immediate successor could have been the powerful Hyksos ruler, Khyan, if he was the third Hyksos king of this dynasty, although Sakir-Har's precise position within this dynasty has not yet been established firmly. The name Sakir-Har may translate as "Reward of Har", or may alternatively derive from the Amorite Sikru-Haddu meaning "The memory of Hadad", in which case Sakir-Har may have reigned after Khyan and Yanassi and immeditely before Apophis.

The fact that Sakir-Har bears an Egyptian titulary as well as the title of heka-khawaset (Hyksos) suggests that the line of kings to which Sakir-Har belongs may have deliberately taken this title for themselves as had been proposed earlier by scholars, including Donald Redford. Bietak shared this opinion, writing that "although this new term [heka-khawaset] perhaps was originally applied by the Egyptians in a disparaging way to the new rulers of the land, the rulers themselves employed ‘Hyksos’ as an official ruler's title". Research has since then refuted the idea that the Egyptians originated the term, further proving that the title of heka-khawaset'', "Ruler of Foreign Lands", was invented by the Hyksos rulers possibly to emphasize their origins or, more explicitly, their Amorite affiliation.

References

Bibliography

External links
 The Sakir-Har doorjamb inscription (slide 12)

17th-century BC Pharaohs
Pharaohs of the Fifteenth Dynasty of Egypt
Year of birth unknown
Year of death unknown